The Quare Fellow is Brendan Behan's first play, first produced in 1954. The title is taken from a Hiberno-English pronunciation of queer.

Plot
The play is set in Mountjoy Prison, Dublin. The anti-hero of the play, The Quare Fellow, is never seen or heard; he functions as the play's central conceit. He is a man condemned to die on the following day, for killing his brother. It revolts his fellow inmates far less than that of The Other Fellow, a very camp, almost Wildean, gay man.

There are three generations of prisoners in Mountjoy including boisterous youngsters who can irritate both other inmates and the audience and the weary old lags Neighbour and "methylated martyr" Dunlavin.

The first act is played out in the cramped area outside five cells and is comedic. After the interval, the pace slows considerably and the play becomes much darker, as the time for the execution approaches. The focus moves to the exercise yard and to the workers who are digging the grave for the soon-to-be-executed Quare Fellow.

The taking of a man's life is examined from many different angles: his fellow prisoners of all hues, the great and the good and the prison officers.

The play is a grimly realistic portrait of prison life in Ireland in the 1950s, and a reminder of the days in which homosexuality was illegal and the death penalty relatively common (35 people were executed between 1923 and 1954, about one every 10½ months). The play is based on Behan's own prison experiences, and highlights the perceived barbarity of capital punishment, then in use in Ireland. The play also attacks the false piety in attitudes to sex, politics and religion.

Name
The title is taken from a Hiberno-English pronunciation of queer, meaning "strange" or "unusual". In context, the word lacks the denotation of homosexuality that it holds today. The play does feature a gay character, but he is referred to as The Other Fellow.

In Ireland, the word 'quare' has also come to be used in a context that means "remarkable" (e.g. "That's a quare day" or "she's a quare singer"), which is most likely the sense in which Behan intends it to be read. It is also used to add accentuation to an adjective, usually as an alternative to 'very' (e.g. "he's a quare good pianist" or "that was quare heavy rain this morning"). The word remains in common use in Ireland.

Performance
The play was offered to Dublin's Abbey Theatre, but was turned down. It premièred at the Pike Theatre Club, Herbert Lane, Dublin, on 19 November 1954 to critical success. The Quare Fellow had its London première in May 1956 at Joan Littlewood's Theatre Workshop at the Theatre Royal Stratford East. On 24 July 1956 it transferred to the Comedy Theatre, London. In September 1956 the Abbey Theatre finally performed The Quare Fellow. It had such success that the Abbey's artistic director, Ria Mooney, pushed the next play back to allow The Quare Fellow to run for six weeks. In October 1956 it transferred to Streatham Hill Theatre. Its first New York performance was on 27 November 1958 at the Circle in the Square Theatre.

1962 Film Adaptation

In 1962 the play was adapted for the screen by Arthur Dreifuss and starred Patrick McGoohan, Sylvia Syms and Walter Macken. Although the film received some favourable reviews, it is not regarded as a faithful adaptation of the play.

Plot
Thomas Crimmin is a new warder at a Dublin prison where two men are condemned to die. One has his sentence commuted. Crimmin falls in love with Kathleen, the wife of the other prisoner, the "quare fellow". 

Kathleen tells Crimmin her husband found her in bed with his brother and that was why her husband killed him.

The quare fellow is hung.

Cast
Patrick McGoohan as Thomas Crimmin
Sylvia Syms as Kathleen
Walter Macken as Regan
Dermot Kelly as Donnelly
Jack Cunningham as Chief Warder
Hilton Edwards as Holy Healy
Philip O'Flynn as Prison Governor
Leo McCabe as Doctor Flyn
Norman Rodway as Lavery
Marie Kean  as Mrs. O'Hara
Pauline Delaney as Mickser's Wife

Production
Blondefilm and CBS were interested in the film rights. However in the end the rights were bought for £2,000 by Arthur Dreifuss.  Dreifuss was under contract to Columbia Pictures at the time but could not interest them in making the movie."The subject scares all hell out of the movie magnates," he said. "We really are making this film on faith, spit and belief."

Originally, Behan was asked to write the script. In the end, Dreifuss did it himself with additional dialogue by James McKenna, author of The Scattering. The script made substantial changes to Behan's original. "We have made explicit what was implicit in the play," said Dreifuss. "We have taken the enclosed world of the play and extended it to the people who are affected in the world outside the prison gates. We have continued the tangent' we have not drawn another line on the plot's graph."

Dreifuss says they tried to end the piece with an upbeat ending. "We're trying to bring the thing full circle," he said. Behan was unhappy with the changes.

Finance was obtained from Bryanston Films, Pathe Corporation in America and the Irish Film Finance Corporation. It was shot in Dublin, including location work at Kilmainham Gaol, with studio work done at Ardmore Studios. Filming started in November 1961.

Release
The film had its world premiere at the Seventh Cork International Film Festival.

Kine Weekly called it "challenging stuff, enacted by an all-but-flawless cast." Variety called it "grim entertainment."

Britain submitted the film to the Venice Film Festival but they rejected it in favour of Term of Trial.

Filmink magazine argued "Syms’ character wasn’t in the play but became the focus of the film, which caused her to get worse reviews than she deserved (from the few people who saw it). She’s actually quite good in a less typical performance (lower class, trash bag) – although the film should’ve been closer to the play."

"The Auld Triangle"
"The Auld Triangle", a song from the opening of the play, has become an Irish music standard and is known by many who are unaware of its link to The Quare Fellow.

References

1954 plays
1950s debut plays
Fictional people sentenced to death
Films about capital punishment
Irish plays adapted into films
Plays by Brendan Behan